Secret Britain is a BBC documentary series which has aired on BBC One since 15 August 2010. The series explores some of the United Kingdom's hidden corners such as deserted beaches and tumbling waterfalls, showcasing the very best of what the British countryside has to offer.

The show focuses on a variety of areas of the British countryside, with a few minutes dedicated to each particular area of interest.

As of the third series, the programme is presented by Ellie Harrison, Chris Hollins and Denise Lewis.

Episodes

Transmissions

Series 1

Series 2

Series 3

References

External links

BBC television documentaries
BBC high definition shows
Nature educational television series
2010 British television series debuts
2010 British television series endings